Sarah Elizabeth Selby (born August 30, 1905 – January 7, 1980) was an American actress.

Career
Selby was a character actress who played minor roles for the most part – usually a town gossip, maiden aunt, or teacher. Beginning her career as a radio actress, she made her screen debut voicing one of the elephants in Disney's Dumbo (1941). She was best known for her recurring role as Ma Smalley, the owner of a boarding house on TV's Gunsmoke (1955). She had recurring roles on The George Burns and Gracie Allen Show, initially as Gracie's friend Mamie Kelly, and then a recurring role as Lucille Vanderlip the society hostess wife of banker Chester Vanderlip.  In 1964, she appeared with Jackie Cooper in an episode of the Twilight Zone (S5E32 - “Caesar & Me”).

She starred in numerous films from 1941 to 1978. In her first role, she voiced the elephant Prissy in the movie Dumbo. Selby was an actress, known for Tower of London (1962), Beyond the Forest (1949) and a recurring role as Aunt Gertrude in The Mickey Mouse Club television series The Hardy Boys: The Mystery of the Applegate Treasure (1956). Among her radio program appearances, she played various roles on 1947 Escape drama anthology series, and was a regular cast member as Grace in the 1948-50 Junior Miss radio sitcom.

Personal life and death 
Selby was married to Holger Yngvar Harthern-Jakobsen, and to Stanley Robert Wuliger. She died from cancer at the age of 74,  on Monday, January 7, 1980,  in Los Angeles California.

Feature-length films

1943
The Seventh Victim - Min Gottschalk 

1944
San Diego, I Love You - Mrs. Lovelace 
The Curse of the Cat People - Miss Plunkett 

1945
The Strange Affair of Uncle Harry - Alice 
Earl Carroll Vanities - Mrs. Thayer 
The Beautiful Cheat - Athena [Haven] 
Wonder Man - Woman in library 
The Naughty Nineties - Mrs. Hawkins 

1946
One Exciting Week - Committee Woman 
Ideal Girl - Esmeralda 
Little Iodine - Mrs. Bigdome 

1947
Swell Guy - Lorraine 
Stork Bites Man - Mrs. Greene 
The Fabulous Texan - Unknown 
That's My Man - Unknown 

1948
A Double Life - Anna 
Trapped by Boston Blackie - Mrs. Carter 
Train to Alcatraz - Widow's friend 

1949
Beyond the Forest - Mildred Sorren 
Prison Warden - Vivian Markham 
Side Street - Nurse Williams 

1950
Perfect Strangers - Mrs. Wilson 

1951
Jim Thorpe – All-American - Miss Benton 

1952
The Sniper - (unknown character role) 
The Iron Mistress - Mrs. Bowie 

1953
Battle Circus - Capt. Dobbs 
Mister Scoutmaster - Mrs. Weber 
The System - Liz Allen 

1954
Men of the Fighting Lady - Mrs. Syzmanski 

1955
Good Morning, Miss Dove - Teacher 
Battle Cry - Mrs. Forrester 
The McConnell Story - Mom Brown 

1957
An Affair to Remember - Miss Lane 
Short Cut to Hell - Adam's secretary 
Gunfire at Indian Gap - Bessie Moran 
Stopover Tokyo - Wife of High Commissioner 
No Time to Be Young - Helen Root 

1962
Moon Pilot - Mrs. Celia Talbot 
Tower of London - The Queen 

1964
Taggart - Maude Taggart 

1967
Don't Make Waves - Ethyl 

1973
The World's Greatest Athlete - Woman in jeep who points out cheetah

Bibliography

References

External links

Sarah Selby at UCLA Film & Television Archive catalog

1905 births
1980 deaths
Actresses from Ohio
American film actresses
American television actresses
Western (genre) film actresses
20th-century American actresses
Western (genre) television actors
Actresses from Los Angeles